The Tindastóll men's basketball team, commonly known as Tindastóll, is the men's basketball department of the Ungmennafélagið Tindastóll sport club. It is based in Sauðárkrókur, Iceland. As of the 2018–19 season it played in Úrvalsdeild karla. In 2015 and 2018, it was the runner up to the Icelandic national championship. On January 13, 2018, the club won its first major title when it beat KR in the Icelandic Basketball Cup finals. On 30 September 2018, Tindastóll defeated KR in the Icelandic Super Cup, 103-72.

Trophies and awards

titles 
Icelandic Basketball Cup:
2018
Icelandic Super Cup:
2018
Icelandic Company Cup (2):
1999, 2012
Division I (3):
1988, 2006, 2014
Division II:
1986

Notable players

Coaches

References

External links

Ungmennafélagið Tindastóll basketball
Sauðárkrókur